Route 98 is a numbered state highway running  in Rhode Island. Route 98's southern terminus is at Route 100 in Chepachet and the northern terminus is a continuation as Massachusetts Route 98 near Uxbridge, Massachusetts.

Route description
Route 98 travels through some very rural and scenic areas of Burrillville.

Route 98 takes the following route through the State:
Chepachet (Town of Glocester): : Route 100 to Burrillville town line
Steere Farm Road
Burrillville: ; Glocester town line to Massachusetts State line at Route 98
Steere Farm Road, Harrisville Main Street, and Sherman Farm Road

History

Major intersections

References

External links

2019 Highway Map, Rhode Island

098
Transportation in Providence County, Rhode Island
Glocester, Rhode Island
Burrillville, Rhode Island